Thomas or Tom Hudson may refer to:

 Thomas Hudson (painter) (1701–1779), British portraitist
 Thomas Hudson (pentathlete) (born 1935), British Olympic modern pentathlete
 Thomas Hudson (poet) (died c. 1605), part of the Castalian Band at the court of James VI of Scotland
 Thomas H. Hudson (born 1946), member of the Louisiana State Senate
 Thomas J. Hudson (born 1961), Canadian genome scientist 
 Thomas Jefferson Hudson (1839–1923), U.S. Representative from Kansas
 Thomas P. Hudson (1852–1909), American-English stage manager in Australia
 Thomas Hudson (MP) (1772–1852), British Member of Parliament for Evesham (UK Parliament constituency)
 Thomas Hudson (songwriter) (1791–1844), English performer and writer of comic songs
 Tom Hudson (programmer), American computer programmer
 Tom Hudson (English actor) (born 1986), English actor
 Tom Hudson (French actor) (born 1994), French actor
 Tom Hudson (art educator) (1922–1997), British art educationalist
 Tom Hudson (rugby union) (born 1994), English rugby union player